The National Economic Commission was failed bipartisan U.S. deficit reduction commission created by the U.S. Congress in December 1987.

References

1987 establishments in the United States